Oujda volcanic field is a volcanic field in Morocco.

References 

Pleistocene volcanoes
Volcanoes of Morocco
Volcanic fields